International reaction to the Gaza War 2008-2009 came from many countries and international organisations. International reaction to the conflict was also notable in the level of civilian demonstrations all around the world, which in many cases displayed sentiment significantly different from the official government line.

Long-term effects and reaction
In the aftermath of the crisis, observers suggested Israel's diplomatic position and foreign reputation had been permanently tainted. The New York Times reported in March that Israel was "facing its worst diplomatic crisis in two decades." Other effects on Israel included: Its sports teams met hostility and violent protests in Sweden, Spain and Turkey. Mauritania closed Israel's embassy. Relations with Turkey, an important Muslim ally, deteriorated severely. A group of top international judges and human rights investigators called for an inquiry into Israel's actions in Gaza. "Israel Apartheid Week" drew participants in 54 cities around the world in March 2009, twice the number of last year, according to its organisers. "And even in the American Jewish community...there is a chill."

Official reactions

Involved parties

 - Prime Minister Ehud Olmert said "we tried to avoid, and I think quite successfully, to hit any uninvolved people - we attacked only targets that are part of the Hamas organisations".

 - Ismail Haniyeh, Hamas' leader in Gaza, called Israel's attacks an "ugly massacre". The leader of Hamas in Damascus, Khaled Mashal, threatened revenge attacks, saying "the time for the Third Intifada has come".

 - President Mahmoud Abbas condemned the attacks and called for restraint. President Mahmoud Abbas blamed Hamas for triggering Israel's deadly raids on Gaza by not extending a six-month truce with Israel. Speaking from Cairo on December 28, 2008, he said that 'we ask[ed] [Hamas] ... not [to] end the truce. Let the truce continue and not stop so that we could have avoided what happened'. Later he called Israeli attacks "barbaric and criminal aggression", and threatened to cut off negotiations with Israel.
 
Fathi Abu Moughli, the Palestinian minister of health, abruptly cut off the payments to Israeli hospitals for treatment of Palestinian patients, forcing hundreds of Palestinians to halt their treatments and cutting them off from proper medical care.

United Nations
The United Nations Security Council issued a statement on December 28, 2008, calling, "for an immediate halt to all violence", the Arab League, and the European Union made similar calls, as did Argentina, Brazil, China, Japan, Malaysia, Mexico, Peru, the Philippines, Russia, South Korea and Vietnam. Libya pushed to issue a Security Council Resolution urging for a cease-fire, an effort which the US blocked, citing the failure of the statement made December 28.

On January 9, 2009, the United Nations Security Council passed Resolution 1860 calling for an immediate ceasefire in Gaza and a full Israeli withdrawal by 14 votes to one abstention (the United States), even though US diplomats had been involved in its drafting. Israel and Hamas both ignored calls for a ceasefire.

The United Nations General Assembly adopted Resolution ES-10/18 on January 16, 2009, calling for support of Security Council Resolution 1860. Only 3 countries (Israel, United States, Nauru) voted against the Resolution.

UN Secretary General Ban Ki-moon called for an immediate ceasefire and condemned both Israel and Hamas.

The United Nations High Commissioner for Human Rights, Navanethem Pillay, called for independent investigations into possible war crimes committed by Israeli forces in the Gaza Strip.

International Organisations

Non-governmental organisations

Countries

Most of the world condemned both belligerents, or neither of them, and simply called for peace or expressed concern for civilian casualties.

Thirty-five states condemned Israel's attacks exclusively. Three of them expressed support for Hamas' operations or defined them as falling within its right of resistance. Bolivia, Mauritania, Qatar, and Venezuela significantly downscaled or severed their relations with Israel in protest of the offensive.

Nineteen states, mostly in the western world, condemned Hamas' attacks exclusively. Thirteen of them expressed support for Israel's operations or defined them as falling within Israel's right to self-defense.

For detailed diplomatic responses, refer to the table below.

Other sovereign entities

Others

Hezbollah leader Hassan Nasrallah has warned that there was a possibility of renewing another conflict. He stated that he was ready for another confrontation with Israel and had previously put all his fighters in the Israeli-Lebanese border on high alert.

Religious leaders

South African Anglican Archbishop Emeritus Desmond Tutu said Israel's bombardment of Gaza "bears all the hallmarks of war crimes. In the context of total aerial supremacy, in which one side in a conflict deploys lethal aircraft against opponents with no means of defending themselves, the bombardment bears all the hallmarks of war crimes." The attacks would not contribute to the security of Israel, he said.

Iraqi Shia leader Ali al-Sistani, called for decisive action by Arab and Muslim states for an end to Israeli attacks on Gaza. Though he condemned the operation, he stated that "supporting our brothers only with words is meaningless, considering the big tragedy they are facing."

Humanitarian aid

Civilian demonstrations and protests

Major protests against Israel were held worldwide. Protesters in London, Paris, Oslo, and other cities clashed with the police. Throughout the West Bank, daily demonstrations were held against the Israeli attacks. Some demonstrations developed to "violent" clashes between stone throwers and Israeli security forces. At least two Palestinians were killed by Israeli forces in the West Bank during protests against the offensive on Gaza: On January 4, a man among a crowd in Qalqilya who clashed with Israeli forces was shot dead, while on January 16, a teenager died after being shot in the head during a demonstration in Hebron. The Palestinian Center For Human Rights (PCHR) reported that between January 15 and January 21, 36 others, including 16 children, were wounded by Israeli forces in the West Bank in various protests against the offensive. There were global isolated attacks against Jewish and Israeli targets,. Over 300 Israeli websites were hacked and defaced with anti-Israeli and anti-US messages during the first days of the conflict. In France, anti-Jewish and anti-Muslim attacks spiked after December 27. and similar increase in attacks happened in the United Kingdom and Sweden.

On January 10, a new wave of protests were held in Europe. In London, an estimated 100,000 people protested against the Israeli attacks. Further protests were held across Europe. Nearly 10,000 gathered in New York City on January 11 to support Israel. In the United States, a McClatchy / Ipsos poll showed that 44% of the general public favored the Israeli operation, while a CNN poll showed that 63% thought Israeli military operation was justified. CNN also reported that 75% of Republicans and 52% of Democrats held this view, though Newsweek found 55% of Republicans and 45% of Democrats approved of Israeli actions. In the Jewish community, the ADL showed that 79% felt the Israeli response was appropriate.
 
Many demonstrations against the strikes occurred in cities around the world, and in Israel protests both for and against the strikes were held. In Egypt, the protests caused the government to reopen the Rafah border crossing to allow the delivery of food and medicine to the Gaza Strip.

The largest protest, of up to a million people, was held at a government organised event in Damascus on January 7. On December the 10th, a new wave of protests were held in Europe. In London, 50,000 people marched to the Israeli embassy - the largest ever pro-Palestinian demonstration in the UK. In Paris 30,000 people marched with banners reading 'We are all children of Gaza'. Further protests were held across Europe.

The Israeli peace movement Gush Shalom condemned the war; they marched in Tel-Aviv in a massive demonstration.

Demonstrations condemning the Israeli offensive

Protests were held in the following cities. A number of student 'sit-in's were also organised, calling upon university authorities to condemn the Israeli bombing of educational institutions in Gaza.

Note: The table can be sorted alphabetically or chronologically using the "><" icon.
Size figures are according to police estimates. Other estimates are noted in the "Notes" box.

Demonstrations supporting Israel
Note: The table can be sorted alphabetically or chronologically using the "><" icon.

Demonstrations calling for peace

Artists' response

Songs
In January 2009 Syrian-American singer-songwriter Michael Heart composed and released a song in support of the Palestinian civilian victims of the Israeli war in Gaza, titled "We Will Not Go Down (Song For Gaza)", which gained popularity on sites like YouTube, internet blogs and forums. The official YouTube video of the song was viewed over 1 million times within a month of its release; the recording of the song was broadcast on radio and television in many countries along with blogs and websites worldwide and it was chanted in many demonstrations in cities ranging from Sydney, Australia to London, England. The Palestine Argentine Delegation Embassy website also put the song with lyrics on its page. Heart made the mp3 of the song freely downloadable from his official website, which he reports has been downloaded over 500,000 times, encouraging the listeners to make a donation to UN Relief and Works Agency for Palestine Refugees (UNRWA). Though musically praised around the world, the song received some political criticism from the Israeli camp.

Theatre plays
Seven Jewish Children: A Play for Gaza is a controversial six-page, 10-minute play by British playwright and a co-patron of the Palestine Solidarity Campaign Caryl Churchill, written in response to the Gaza War, and first performed at London's Royal Court Theatre on 6 February 2009. Churchill has said that anyone wishing to produce it may do so gratis, so long as they hold a collection for the people of Gaza at the end. consists of seven scenes spread over roughly seventy years, in which Jewish adults discuss what, or whether, their children should be told about certain events in recent Jewish history that the play alludes to only indirectly.
Short plays written in response to Seven Jewish Children
Seven Palestinian Children by Deb Margolin.
Seven Other Children by Richard Stirling.
What Strong Fences Make by The New York playwright Israel Horovitz who argues "another voice needed to be heard" against Churchill's play, that he claims as "offensive, distorted and manipulative".

See also
2008–2009 Gaza Strip aid
Antisemitic incidents occurring during the 2008–2009 Israel–Gaza conflict
International reactions to the Gaza flotilla raid

References

External links
European Reactions to Israel's Gaza Operation, Jerusalem Center for Public Affairs 29 January 2009
REACTION-Israeli attacks on Gaza, Reuters 27 December 2008
Reaction in quotes: Gaza bombing, BBC 28 December 2008

Gaza War (2008–2009)
Protests in the United Kingdom
Protests in London
Protests in France
Protests in Norway
Protests in the United States
Protests in Egypt
Protests in Israel
International reactions to armed conflicts
Protests in the European Union
Reactions to 2000s events
Riots in London